Negative regulator of P-body association is a protein that in humans is encoded by the LINC01420 gene.

References 

Proteins